KKLN (94.1 FM, "94.1 The Loon") is a radio station in Willmar, Minnesota, broadcasting from the Kandi Mall and airing a mainstream rock format. Following FCC approval of the transfer of license on Nov. 3, 2009, the station is owned by Headwaters Media, LLC, a company started by the General Manager and Chief Financial Officer.

History
94.1 FM (previous call letters: KYRS) switched from country music to classic and new rock at 6 p.m. on June 26, 1999.  For the next 94 hours, they played commercial free music.  In October 1999, The Loon moved their studios from Atwater, MN to Willmar, MN, inside the Kandi Mall.  In May 2006, The Loon began syndicating Alice Cooper's evening show, Nights with Alice Cooper.  In February 2008, The Loon began broadcasting the NASCAR Sprint Cup Series, via the Motor Racing Network (MRN) and Performance Racing Network (PRN).  In September 2008, The Loon began broadcasting NFL Primetime games (Sunday, Monday and Thursday nights) from Westwood One.  In October 2008, Eric Perkins of KARE 11 news joined as an afternoon sports commentator at 4:35 p.m. and 5:35 p.m. The station began carrying Pink Floyd program Floydian Slip with Craig Bailey on April 9, 2011.

Programming
Notable weekday programming includes Loon Mornings (with Nate Thomas), The Rock Soup with Nate Thomas, afternoons with Rob Ryan, "The Eric Perkins Sports Drive" (with Eric Perkins, formerly from KARE 11 News), and Nights with Alice Cooper.

External links
94.1 The Loon KKLN official website

Mainstream rock radio stations in the United States
Radio stations in Minnesota